Harold Gordon "Tanky" Challenor, MM (16 March 1922 – 28 August 2008) was a wartime member of the SAS, decorated for his part in Operation Speedwell.  After the war, he joined the Metropolitan Police, spending much of his career in Criminal Investigation Department (CID). In 1963, when holding the rank of Detective Sergeant, he was charged with corruption offences and was subsequently found to have been suffering from mental health problems and deemed not to be fit to stand trial. He was sent to a secure hospital, and on his release, he joined the firm of solicitors which had defended him. A public inquiry was held into his actions and why his health problems had not been noticed by his superiors.

War service
During the Second World War, Challenor served as a member of the Royal Army Medical Corps in North Africa and Italy between 1942 and 1944 before joining 62 Commando, which later formed part of the Special Air Service, as a lance-corporal. He later described himself as "the most aggressive medical orderly the Commandos ever had". He received the nickname of "Tanky" after losing his commando beret and having to borrow one from the Tank Corps.

From 7 September 1943, he took part in Operation Speedwell in which he helped derail three trains behind enemy lines. Following the operation, Challenor was twice captured but managed to escape each time, eventually reaching safety. He was one of only two out of the six soldiers involved in the operation to survive.

Challenor was awarded the Military Medal on 9 November 1944.

The citation read:

In later service, Challoner began to show a propensity for violence towards prisoners. In describing an occasion when he was in charge of some captive Gestapo officers, he recalled that "[o]ne of them made the mistake of smiling at me. The gaze I returned had him backing away. Then I took them out one by one and exercised them with some stiff fisticuffs." He was already showing signs of delusions at this stage of his career. Challenor eventually reached the rank of company quartermaster sergeant before completing his military service in 1947.

Police service
Challenor joined the Metropolitan Police in 1951. During his police career, he served in the CID and the Flying Squad before eventually moving to West End Central Police Station in Mayfair in 1962, from here he was involved in policing the Soho area of London. At one point, he had a record of over 100 arrests in seven months and he eventually totalled 600 arrests and received 18 commendations. By the end of his career, Challoner's modus operandi included punching a suspect from Barbados while singing "Bongo, bongo, bongo, I don't want to leave the Congo". Various of his accused claimed to have been beaten up or have had evidence planted on them but, at first, this did not prevent conviction.

The Challenor Case
Challenor met his match on 11 July 1963 when he arrested Donald Rooum, a cartoonist for Peace News, who was demonstrating outside Claridge's hotel against Queen Frederika of Greece. He told Rooum: "You're fucking nicked, my beauty. Boo the Queen, would you?" and hit him on the head. Going through Rooum's possessions, Challenor added a half-brick, saying, "There you are, me old darling. Carrying an offensive weapon. You can get two years for that." Rooum, a member of the National Council for Civil Liberties who had read about forensic science, handed his clothes to his solicitor for testing. No brick dust or appropriate wear and tear were found and Rooum was acquitted, although other people Challenor arrested at the demonstration were still convicted on his evidence.

By the time Challenor appeared at the Old Bailey in 1964, charged with conspiracy to pervert the course of justice, he was deemed to be unfit to plead and was sent to Netherne mental hospital with a diagnosis of paranoid schizophrenia. Since then, it has been suggested that he might have been suffering from posttraumatic stress disorder. Three other detectives (David Oakley, Frank Battes and Keith Goldsmith) were sentenced to three years in prison.

The case of Challenor was raised in parliament on several occasions. A statutory inquiry headed by Arthur James was eventually set up - the first such under the Police Act 1964. It was considered by some to be a whitewash and to have allowed police corruption to continue within the Metropolitan Police unabated. In the report, Challenor's mental illness was blamed for the false arrests rather than a systemic policy of framing suspects. The lack of a follow-up prosecution of Challenor after he was discharged from hospital was also criticised as establishment corruption. Because of this, "doing a Challenor" became a police slang expression for avoiding punishment and prosecution through retiring sick from the force. "According to Mary Grigg's The Challenor Case, a total of twenty-six innocent men were charged during Challenor's corrupt activities. Of these thirteen were imprisoned spending a total of thirteen years in gaol. On his release from the hospital, Challoner worked for the firm of solicitors which had defended him during his trial."

In film and literature
In 1966, BBC's Wednesday Play television series included Clive Exton's The Boneyard whose main character - a psychotic police officer - was based on Challenor. Challenor was the subject of the novel The Strange Affair by Bernard Toms and of the 1968 film of the same name. He also was the model for Inspector Truscott in the play Loot by Joe Orton, which was also adapted for a film version. Challenor himself produced a memoir in 1990 entitled SAS and the Met. It was co-written with Alfred Draper. In the Swedish Novel "The Abominable Man" (published 1971, filmed 1976) by Maj Sjöwall and Per Wahlöö, Challenor is mentioned in passing in regard to a crime being investigated that appears to have been committed by "a madman." The person murdered is compared to Challenor as being a very bad policeman.

Notes

References

Grigg, Mary (1965) The Challenor Case, London, Penguin Books
Barber, Chris "Another Brick in the Law:Met. Detective Sergeant Challenor, Building-up Evidence" in Jack Sargeant (ed.) Bad Cop / Bad Cop: A Badge, a Gun and No Mercy, London: Virgin Books, 2003 . (extract link verified 22 September 2008)

Further reading
Morton, James (1993) Bent Coppers pp. 114–122

External links
Parliamentary answers on Challenor for 2 July 1964
Parliamentary statement on James Report by the Secretary of State for the Home Department and questions, 5 August 1965
Parliamentary questions on the James Report 4 November 1965
Documents held by The National Archives relating the enquiry into Challoner.

1922 births
2008 deaths
Recipients of the Military Medal
Police misconduct in England
Police officers convicted of assault
Metropolitan Police officers
British Army personnel of World War II
Special Air Service soldiers
Royal Army Medical Corps soldiers
British Army Commandos soldiers